Fred Brand (1925–2016) was an English speedway rider.

Speedway career 
Brand reached the final of the Speedway World Championship in the 1954 Individual Speedway World Championship. He rode in the British speedway leagues, riding mainly for the Yarmouth Bloaters where he earned the nickname the "Master of Caister Road".

World final appearances

Individual World Championship
 1954 -  London, Wembley Stadium - 8th - 7pts

References 

1925 births
2016 deaths
British speedway riders
Yarmouth Bloaters riders
Norwich Stars riders